The U.S. Highways in Tennessee are the segments of the United States Numbered Highway System that are maintained by the Tennessee Department of Transportation (TDOT) in the state of Tennessee. All of these highways in Tennessee have a state highway designation routed concurrently along them, though the state highway is hidden and only signed along the green mile marker signs that display mileage within each county.


U.S. Highways

Special routes

See also

References

External links

 
US